Digital Research, Inc. (DR or DRI) was a privately held American software company created by Gary Kildall to market and develop his CP/M operating system and related 8-bit, 16-bit and 32-bit systems like MP/M, Concurrent DOS, FlexOS, Multiuser DOS, DOS Plus, DR DOS and GEM. It was the first large software company in the microcomputer world. Digital Research was originally based in Pacific Grove, California, later in Monterey, California.

Overview

In 1972, Gary Kildall, an instructor at the Naval Postgraduate School in Monterey, California, began working at Intel as a consultant under the business name Microcomputer Applications Associates (MAA). By 1974, he had developed Control Program/Monitor, or CP/M, the first disk operating system for microcomputers. In 1974 he incorporated as Intergalactic Digital Research, with his wife handling the business side of the operation. The company soon began operating under its shortened name Digital Research.

The company's operating systems, starting with CP/M for 8080/Z80-based microcomputers, were the de facto standard of their era. Digital Research's product suite included the original 8-bit CP/M and its various offshoots like MP/M (1979), a multi-tasking multi-user version of CP/M.

The first 16-bit system was CP/M-86 (1981, adapted to the IBM PC in early 1982), which was meant as direct competitor to MS-DOS. There followed the multi-tasking MP/M-86 (1981), and Concurrent CP/M (1982), a single-user version featuring virtual consoles from which applications could be launched to run concurrently.

In May 1983 Digital Research announced that it would offer PC DOS versions of all of its languages and utilities. It remained influential, with  million in 1983 sales making Digital Research the fourth-largest microcomputer software company. Admitting that it had "lost" the 8088 software market but hoped to succeed with the Intel 80286 and Motorola 68000, by 1984 the company formed a partnership with AT&T Corporation to develop software for Unix System V and sell its own and third-party products in retail stores. Jerry Pournelle warned later that year, however, that "Many people of stature seem to have left or are leaving Digital Research. DR had better get its act together."

Successive revisions of Concurrent CP/M incorporated MS-DOS API emulation (since 1983), which gradually added more support for DOS applications and the FAT file system. These versions were named Concurrent DOS (1984), with Concurrent PC DOS (1984) being the version adapted to run on IBM compatible PCs.

In 1985, soon after the introduction of the 80286-based IBM PC/AT, Digital Research introduced a real-time system, initially called Concurrent DOS 286, which later evolved into the modular FlexOS (1986). This exploited the greater memory addressing capability of the new CPU to provide a more flexible multi-tasking environment. There was a small but powerful set of system APIs, each with a synchronous and an asynchronous variant. Pipes were supported, and all named resources could be aliased by setting environment variables. This system was to enjoy enduring favour in point-of-sale systems.

Other successors of Concurrent DOS were Concurrent DOS XM (1986) and the 32-bit Concurrent DOS 386 (1987), and finally Multiuser DOS (1991).

Digital Research's multi-user family of operating systems was sidelined by single-user offsprings DOS Plus (1985) and DR DOS (1988). The latter system was marketed as a direct MS-DOS/PC DOS replacement with added functionality. In order to achieve this, it gave up built-in support to run CP/M applications and was changed to use DOS-compatible internal structures. It became a successful product line in itself.

Digital Research was purchased by Novell for  million in 1991, primarily for Novell to gain access to the operating system line. FlexOS had already been adopted as the basis for Siemens S5-DOS/MT, IBM 4680 OS and 4690 OS, whereas Multiuser DOS evolved further into independent products like Datapac System Manager, IMS REAL/32 and REAL/NG. Continued development of the DR DOS line led to non-DRI products such as Novell PalmDOS, Novell DOS, Caldera OpenDOS and Dell RMK.

In a parallel development Digital Research also produced a selection of programming language compilers and interpreters for their OS-supported platforms, including C, Pascal, COBOL, FORTRAN, PL/I, PL/M, CBASIC, BASIC, and Logo. They also produced a microcomputer version of the GKS graphics standard (related to NAPLPS) called GSX, and later used this as the basis of their GEM GUI. Less known are their application programs, limited largely to the GSX-based DR DRAW and a small suite of GUI programs for GEM.

CP/M-86 and DOS
At the time the IBM Personal Computer was being developed, Digital Research's CP/M was the dominant operating system of the day. In 1980, IBM asked Digital Research to supply a version of CP/M written for the Intel 8086 microprocessor as the standard operating system for the PC, which would use the code-compatible Intel 8088 chip. Digital Research, uneasy about the conditions related to making such an agreement with IBM, refused.

Microsoft seized this opportunity to supply an OS, in addition to other software (e.g., BASIC) for the new IBM PC. When the IBM PC arrived in late 1981, it came with PC DOS, an OEM version of MS-DOS, which was developed from 86-DOS, which Microsoft had acquired for this purpose. By mid-1982, MS-DOS was also marketed for use in hardware-compatible non-IBM computers. This one decision resulted in Microsoft becoming the leading name in computer software.

This story is detailed from the point of view of Microsoft and IBM in the PBS series Triumph of the Nerds, and from the point of view of Gary Kildall's friends and coworkers in The Computer Chronicles.

Digital Research developed CP/M-86 as an alternative to MS-DOS and it was made available through IBM in early 1982. The company later created an MS-DOS clone with advanced features called DR DOS, which pressured Microsoft to further improve its own DOS.

The competition between MS-DOS and DR DOS is one of the more controversial chapters of microcomputer history. Microsoft offered better licensing terms to any computer manufacturer that committed to selling MS-DOS with every system they shipped, making it uneconomical for them to offer systems with another OS, since the manufacturer would still be required to pay a license fee to Microsoft for that system. This practice led to a US Department of Justice investigation, resulting in a decision in 1994 that barred Microsoft from "per-processor" licensing.

Digital Research (and later its successor Caldera) accused Microsoft of announcing vaporware versions of MS-DOS to suppress sales of DR DOS.

In one beta release of Windows 3.1, Microsoft included hidden code (later called the AARD code) that detected DR DOS and displayed a cryptic error message. Although this code was not enabled in the final version of Windows 3.1, it gave the wrong impression that DR DOS was incompatible with MS-DOS and Windows among testers. These activities came to light when the discovery process of the subsequent lawsuit uncovered emails from senior Microsoft executives that showed this time bomb plant was part of a concerted program to drive Digital Research out of the PC operating systems business.

Digital Research's successor Caldera raised these disputes in a 1996 lawsuit, but the case was settled one day before the trial in 2000. As a condition of the settlement Microsoft paid Caldera an undisclosed sum, which in 2009 was revealed to be  million and Caldera destroyed all documents it had produced in connection with the case. Although a costly settlement to Microsoft, this eliminated some of the evidence of Microsoft's anti-trust behaviors, and allowed Microsoft to control and dominate this sector of the marketplace and without concerns about any further serious competitor.

Notable employees
Apart from founder Gary Kildall several notable employees worked at Digital Research, some of which later made important contributions to the IT industry, such as Gordon Eubanks, Tom Rolander, Lee Jay Lorenzen, Don Heiskell, John Meyer, and Ed McCracken.

Acquisitions 
 Compiler Systems, Inc. (1981) for CBASIC
 MT MicroSYSTEMS, Inc. (1981) for Pascal/MT+

See also
 Multiuser DOS Federation
 Novell Digital Research Systems Group
 Caldera Digital Research Systems Group

References

Further reading
   (NB. Marc Perkel claimed to have inspired Novell in February 1991 to buy Digital Research and develop something he called "NovOS".)
  (18 pages)

External links

 Digital Research's history website
 Various Digital Research manuals
 Joe Wein's page on Digital Research
 Intel iPDS-100 Using CP/M-Video

 
1972 establishments in California
1991 disestablishments in California
American companies established in 1972
Companies based in Monterey County, California
Defunct computer companies based in California
Defunct software companies of the United States
Novell
Point of sale companies
Software companies disestablished in 1991
Software companies established in 1972
1991 mergers and acquisitions